The 2020 Kilkenny Senior Hurling League was the 27th staging of the Kilkenny Senior Hurling League since its establishment by the Kilkenny County Board in 1992. The league began on 31 July 2020 and ended on 23 August 2020.

Dicksboro were the defending champions.

On 23 August 2020, Dicksboro won the league after beating O'Loughlin Gaels 3-0 in a penalty shoot-out at UPMC Nowlan Park, after the game had ended 1-20 apiece after extra time. It was the first league final to be decided on penalties. 

Dicksboro's Shane Stapleton was the league's top scorer with 1-37.

Results

Group A

Table

Results

Group B

Table

Results

Knockout stage

Shield final

Final

League statistics

Top scorers

Overall

In a single game

References

External link

 2020 Kilkenny SHL fixtures and results

Hurling competitions in Leinster
Hurling competitions in County Kilkenny